The Euro Beach Soccer Cup (EBSC), originally known as the European Pro Beach Soccer Championships until 2004, was a biennial (previously annual) beach soccer competition contested between European men's national teams, organised by Beach Soccer Worldwide (BSWW). Having started in 1998, the tournament's prestige has held in being one of the oldest and longest running beach soccer competitions in Europe and the world. It is currently merged with Euro Beach Soccer League.

History
Historically, the top eight ranking teams from the previous Euro Beach Soccer League qualified to contest the cup, hence the similar naming, with the first edition in 1998 starting off the back of the first EBSL season earlier in the year, making it one of beach soccer's main prestigious tournaments. However, due to saturation in the calendar in recent years, the once major championship has been somewhat back-benched. The participating teams are not always the best ranked as in the past (notably in 2008 and 2014), with entry requirements being more lax/down to invitation, and the tournament has been moved to every two years, the last annual edition coming in 2010.

Portugal are the most successful team and the current champions, having won the tournament for the seventh time in 2016 having failed to win since 2006.

The cup is played as a straight knock-out tournament, other than in the 1998, 2008 and 2014 editions when a group stage was used first before a set of knock-out rounds.

In 2016, BSWW began a women's edition of the event, to be hosted annually.

Men's tournaments

Results

Successful national teams

Overall standings
As 2016

Note:
Win in Common Time W = 3 Points / Win in Extra Time WE = 2 Points / Win in Penalty shoot-out WP = 1 Point / Lose L = 0 Points

Team appearances 
These are the nations who have appeared in the Euro Beach Soccer Cup since 1998.
Legend
 – Champions
 – Runners-up
 – Third place
 – Fourth place
5th − Fifth place
6th − Sixth place
7th − Seventh place
8th − Eighth place
QF – Quarterfinals or seventh/eighth place
R1 – Round 1 (group stage)
• – Did not play
 – Hosts

1 Includes one appearance as Yugoslavia

Women's tournaments

Results

Successful national teams

References

External links
 http://theroonba.com/beach98.htm
 http://www.beachsoccer.com/

 
Beach soccer competitions
Recurring sporting events established in 1998
1998 establishments in Europe